Jean Thomas Guillaume Lorge (born 22 November 1767 in Caen; died 28 November 1826 in Chauconin-Neufmontiers), was a French cavalry commander during the French Revolutionary and Napoleonic Wars. Lorge is one of the names inscribed under the Arc de Triomphe, on Column 6.

Notes

References

French military personnel of the French Revolutionary Wars
1767 births
1826 deaths
Cavalry commanders
French generals
French commanders of the Napoleonic Wars
Military personnel from Caen
Names inscribed under the Arc de Triomphe